Siah Kamar (also Romanized as Sīāh Kamar and Seyāh Kamar) is a village in Chaharduli Rural District, in the Central District of Asadabad County, Hamadan Province, Iran. At the 2006 census, its population was 58, in 11 families.

References 

Populated places in Asadabad County